Iwo Jima, now officially romanized Iōtō ("Sulfur Island"), is one of the Japanese Volcano Islands, which lie south of the Bonin Islands and together with them make up the Ogasawara Archipelago. Together with the Izu Islands, they make up Japan's Nanpō Islands.

Only  in size, the island is still volcanic and emits sulfurous gases. Although likely passed by Micronesians who made their way to the Bonins to the north, Iwo Jima was largely ignored by the Spanish, Dutch, British, and Japanese until a relatively late date after its 1543 rediscovery. The Japanese eventually colonized the island, administering it as the Ioto or Iojima Village under Tokyo's jurisdiction until all civilians were forcibly evacuated to Honshu in July 1944 near the end of World War II. Because it was able to provide secure airfields within easy range of the Japanese Home Islands, Iwo Jima was not passed by like other Pacific fortresses; instead, the Battle of Iwo Jima between February 1945 and March 1945 was some of the fiercest fighting of the Pacific War, with Imperial Japan and the United States both suffering over 20,000 casualties. Joe Rosenthal's photograph of the second flagraising on Mount Suribachi has become one of the most famous examples of wartime photojournalism and an iconic American image. Following the Japanese surrender, the US military occupied Iwo Jima along with the other Nanpo Islands and the Ryukyus, notionally as preparation for a future United Nations trust territory but largely as a means of technically claiming that no nuclear weapons were being stored on Japanese soil. Iwo Jima was returned to Japan with the Bonins in 1968. 

Now technically part of the territory of the Bonins' Ogasawara Village, the island still has no permanent inhabitants except a Self-Defense Force base on its Central Field. Its soldiers, sailors, and airmen receive their own services from Ayase or Sayama but provide emergency assistance to communities on the Bonins who are still connected with the mainland only by an infrequent day-long ferry.

Name

The original records of De la Torre's 1543 expedition have been lost, but he does not appear to have separately named Iwo Jima, despite later sources sometimes miscrediting him with the name Sulfur or Sulphur Island (orig.  or ). Instead, he seems to have only named the Volcano Islands as a group (orig. ) after an eruptionprobably on South Iwo Jimaactive as his ship passed through the area.

Other Spanish explorers may have named or renamed the island in the years afterward. Certainly, John Gore was aware of Spanish accounts of the area with him when he visited in 1779 and recorded its English name as Sulphur Island. 

The name was subsequent calqued into Late Middle Japanese with the Sino-Japanese form and pronunciation Iwōtō or Iwō-tō ("Sulfur Island"), still used by the control tower for the remaining airport. In the past this was also sometimes romanized as Iwautau. The native Japanese reading of the same character  is shima (leading to the English misreading Iwo Shima), which typically shifts to jima when prefixed by another character. This archaic or mistaken form of the Japanese name was particularly reinforced by its use by the Japanese naval officers who arrived to fortify the island ahead of US invasion during the Second World War. 

In general Japanese use, the /w/ has dropped out of the modern pronunciation to become Iōtō or Iō-tō, a spelling formally adopted following Japan's 1946 orthography reform. The high-profile Clint Eastwood films Flags of Our Fathers and Letters from Iwo Jima revived complaints from prewar residents about continued misreadings of the island's name, particularly within Japanese. After formal debate, the Japanese Ministry of Land, Infrastructure, Transport, and Tourism's Geographical Survey Institute formally announced on 18 June 2007 that the official pronunciation would return to Iōtō or Iō-tō.

Geography

Named after a Japanese grinding bowl, the summit of Mount Suribachi is the highest point on the island. Iwo Jima is unusually flat and featureless for a volcanic island. Suribachi is the only obvious volcanic feature, as the island is only the resurgent dome (raised centre) of a larger submerged volcanic caldera surrounding the island. The island forms part of the Kazan-retto islands Important Bird Area (IBA), designated by BirdLife International.

Just south of Minami-Iō-jima are the Mariana Islands.

The visible island stands on a plateau (probably made by wave erosion) at depth about 15 m, which is the top of an underwater mountain 1.5 km to 2 km tall and 40 km diameter at base.

Eruption history
Iwo Jima has a history of minor volcanic activity a few times per year (fumaroles, and their resultant discolored patches of seawater nearby). In November 2015 Iwo Jima was placed first in a list of ten dangerous volcanoes, with volcanologists saying there was a one in three chance of a large eruption from one of the ten this century.

Prehistoric
 Earlier: An undersea volcano started, and built up into a volcanic island. It was truncated, either by caldera-forming eruption or by sea erosion.
 About 760±20 BC: a large eruption with pyroclastic flows and lava destroyed a previous forested island
 131±20BC and 31±20 BC: carbon-14 date of seashells found buried in lava at Motoyama (see map)
 Micronesian tools and carvings found in the Bonin Islands to the north suggest Iwo Jima may have been visited or inhabited as well. With limited archaeological access, however, no such remains have been found to date.

Witnessed
(No attempt would be successful until 1565.) Attempting to secure reinforcements for Ruy López de Villalobos when Filipino resistance proved unexpectedly strong, De la Torre apparently passed the islands during an eruption on South Iwo Jima, realized his supply of water would be insufficient for completing his mission, and returned south to rendezvous with López de Villalobos in the Moluccas. Over the next century, other Spanish sailors passed the islandsparticularly once Alonso de Arellano found a safe northeastern route back to Mexico from the Philippineswithout settling or formally claiming them. The Volcano Islands did, however, form part of the notional boundaries between the Spanish and Portuguese Empires in the Eastern Hemisphere following the treaties of Tordesillas and Zaragosa, such that the Spanish considered them within their sphere of influence.
15 November 1779: Following British captain James Cook's death on Hawaii, ships previously under his command landed on Iwo Jima during the return voyage from his 3rd expedition. Gore's visit was sometimes misunderstood or misrepresented as a new discovery, as in the report in the December 1786 supplement to The New London Magazine: 
28 March 1957: A phreatic eruption occurred without warning 2 km northeast of Suribachi, lasting 65 minutes and ejecting material 30 m (100 feet) high from one crater. Another crater, 30 m (100 feet) wide and 15 m (50 feet) deep, formed by collapse 50 minutes after the eruption ended.
9–10 March 1982: Five phreatic eruptions occurred from vents on the northwest shore of the island.
21 September 2001: A submarine eruption began from three vents southeast of Iwo-jima. It built a 10 m (33 feet) diameter pyroclastic cone.
October 2001: A small phreatic eruption at Idogahama (a beach on the northwest coast of the island) made a crater 10 m (33 feet) wide and 2–3 m deep.
May 2012: Fumaroles, and discolored patches of seawater were seen northeast of the island, indicating further submarine activity.
May to June 2013: Series of smaller volcanic earthquakes.
April 2018: A number of volcanic earthquakes, high white plumes up to 700 m.
30 October to 5 November 2019: Volcanic quakes and subaerial eruption.
29 April to 5 May 2020: Subaerial eruption and volcanic plume rising up to 1 km in height.
8 September to 6 October 2020: Volcanic plume up to 1 km in height and a minor eruption.
24 November 2021: Small phreatic eruption occurred with the ash plume height yet to be known.

Volcanological external links
6 cross sections of stages in the c. 760±20 BC eruption
SW-NE geological cross section through Suribachiyama

Climate

Iwo Jima has a tropical climate (Af) with long hot summers and warm winters with mild nights.

History

Pre-1945
The island was first visited by a westerner in October 1543, by Spanish sailor Bernardo de la Torre on board the carrack San Juan de Letrán when trying to return from Sarangani to New Spain.

In the late 16th century, the island was discovered by the Japanese.

Before World War II Iwo Jima was administered as Iōjima village and was (and is today) part of Tokyo. A census in June 1943 reported an island civilian population of 1,018 (533 males, 485 females) in 192 households in six settlements. The island had a primary school, a Shinto shrine, and one police officer; it was serviced by a mail ship from Haha-jima once a month, and by Nippon Yusen ship once every two months. The island's economy relied upon sulfur mining, sugarcane farming, and fishing; an isolated island in the middle of the Pacific Ocean with poor economic prospects, Iwo Jima had to import all rice and consumer goods from the Home Islands.

Even before the beginning of World War II, there was a garrison of the Imperial Japanese Navy at the southern part of Iwo Jima. It was off-limits to the island's civilian population, who already had little contact with the naval personnel, except for trading.

Throughout 1944, Japan conducted a massive military buildup on Iwo Jima in anticipation of a U.S. invasion. In July 1944, the island's civilian population was forcibly evacuated, and no civilians have permanently settled on the island since.

War-displaced islanders who are now in their 80's and older longed to return to the island, which they considered "a special place associated with memories both happy and sad". Their repeated requests to return to the island have not been realized given the reason that the area has a dynamic volcanic activity. Former islanders and their family members, however, are occasionally granted permission to visit the graves of their ancestors. Islanders and their descendants are trying to write down their memories, interview other former islanders, and create "a digital archive of photos to preserve memories of life on the now-forbidden island to pass them down to posterity" for younger generations who may not appreciate that Iwo Jima was once a place many had called home.

Battle of Iwo Jima

The American invasion of Iwo Jima began on February 19, 1945, and continued to March 26, 1945. The battle was a major initiative of the Pacific Campaign of World War II. The Marine invasion, known as "Operation Detachment", was charged with the mission of capturing the airfields on the island for use by P-51 fighters, and rescue of damaged heavy bombers that were not able to reach their main bases at Guam and Saipan; until then Japanese warplanes from there had harried U.S. bombing missions to Tokyo.

The battle was marked by some of the fiercest fighting of the war. The Imperial Japanese Army positions on the island were heavily fortified, with vast bunkers, hidden artillery, and 18 kilometres (11 mi) of tunnels. The battle was the first U.S. attack on the Japanese Home Islands and the Imperial soldiers defended their positions tenaciously.  Of the 21,000 Japanese soldiers present at the beginning of the battle, over 19,000 were killed and only 1,083 taken prisoner.

One of the first objectives after landing on the beachhead was the taking of Mount Suribachi. At the second raising of a flag on the peak, Joe Rosenthal photographed six Marines raising the United States flag on the fourth day of the battle (February 23). 

The photograph was extremely popular, and won the Pulitzer Prize for Photography that same year.  It is regarded as one of the most significant and recognizable images of the war.

After the fall of Mount Suribachi in the south, the Japanese still held a strong position throughout the island. General Tadamichi Kuribayashi still had the equivalent of eight infantry battalions, a tank regiment, two artillery, and three heavy mortar battalions, plus the 5,000 gunners and naval infantry. With the landing area secure, more troops and heavy equipment came ashore and the invasion proceeded north to capture the airfields and the remainder of the island. Most Japanese soldiers fought to the death. On the night of March 25, a 300-man Japanese force launched a final counterattack led by Kuribayashi.  The island was officially declared "secured" the following morning.

According to the U.S. Navy, "The 36-day (Iwo Jima) assault resulted in more than 26,000 American casualties, including 6,800 dead." Comparatively, the 82-day Battle of Okinawa lasted from early April until mid-June 1945 and U.S. (five Army, two Marine Corps Divisions and Navy personnel on ships) casualties were over 62,000 of whom over 12,000 were killed or missing, while the Battle of the Bulge lasted 40 days (16 December 1944 – 25 January 1945) with almost 90,000 U.S. casualties  comprising 19,000 killed, 47,500 wounded and 23,000 captured or missing.

After Iwo Jima was declared secured, about 3,000 Japanese soldiers were left alive in the island's warren of caves and tunnels. Those who could not bring themselves to commit suicide hid in the caves during the day and came out at night to prowl for provisions. Some did eventually surrender and were surprised that the Americans often received them with compassion – offering them water, cigarettes, or coffee.  The last of these stragglers, two of Lieutenant Toshihiko Ohno's men (Ohno's body was never found), Kōfuku Yamakage and Rikio Matsudo, lasted three and a half years, surrendering on January 6, 1949.

The U.S. military occupied Iwo Jima until June 26, 1968, when it was returned to Japan.

In memory of the battle, three ships of the U.S. Navy have been named :

 , a planned  which began construction in early 1945, but cancelled in August 1945 with the end of the war. It was eventually scrapped in 1949.
 , the lead ship of the s, served from 1961 to 1993, and scrapped in 1995.

Reunion of Honor
On February 19, 1985, the 40th anniversary of the day that U.S. forces began the assault on the island, veterans from both forces gathered for the Reunion of Honor just a few meters/yards away from the spot where U.S. Marines had landed on the island.
During the memorial service a granite plaque was unveiled with the message:

On the 40th anniversary of the battle of Iwo Jima, American and Japanese veterans met again on these same sands, this time in peace and friendship. We commemorate our comrades, living and dead, who fought here with bravery and honor, and we pray together that our sacrifices on Iwo Jima will always be remembered and never be repeated.

It is inscribed on both sides of the plaque, with the English translation facing the beaches where U.S. forces landed and the Japanese translation facing inland, where Japanese troops defended their position.

After that, the Japan–U.S. combination memorial service of the 50th anniversary was held in front of this monument in March 1995. The 55th anniversary was held in 2000, followed by a 60th reunion in March 2005 (see U.S. National Park Service photo below), and a 70th anniversary ceremony on March 21, 2015.

A memorial service held on the island in 2007 got particular attention because it coincided with the release of the movie Letters from Iwo Jima. The joint U.S.–Japanese ceremony was attended by Yoshitaka Shindo, a Japanese lawmaker who is the grandson of the Japanese commander during the battle, Lt. Gen. Tadamichi Kuribayashi, and Yasunori Nishi, the son of Colonel Baron Takeichi Nishi, the Olympic gold medalist equestrian who died commanding a tank unit on the island.

Active Marines have also visited the island on occasion for Professional Military Education (PME).

Japanese military base
The Japan Maritime Self-Defense Force (JMSDF) operates a naval air base on the island at Central Field. The airstrip is 2,650 meters (8,700 ft) long and 60 meters (200 ft) wide. The JMSDF is in charge of support, air traffic control, fueling, and rescue. The airstrip is occasionally used for emergency landings by commercial airplanes flying transpacific routes. The IATA airport code of IWO and the ICAO airport code of RJAW are assigned to the airfield. The Japan Air Self-Defense Force also uses the base. The Japan Ground Self-Defense Force is in charge of explosive ordnance disposal, and maintains a garrison of 400 troops on the island. Two abandoned airfields from World War II are nearby, North Field to the north of the current air base, and an unfinished Japanese airfield to the south of the base, which was improved after the U.S. invasion of the island.

The U.S. Navy's Carrier Air Wing Five, based at the United States Naval Air Facility Atsugi when not deployed aboard , also uses the base for field carrier landing practice (FCLP). The U.S. Navy still has a  disused communication facility (Iwo-Jima Communication Site) on the island, while the U.S. Coast Guard's Iwo Jima LORAN-C transmitter facility was transferred to Japan in 1993 and demolished in 1994.

Civilian access to the island is restricted to those attending memorial services for U.S. and Japanese fallen soldiers, construction workers for the naval air base, and meteorological agency officials. The Japanese troops stationed on the island register their residential addresses in Ayase, Kanagawa or Sayama, Saitama for voting, tax, and social security purposes. Officially, there is no population on the island.

U.S. nuclear arms base
Iwo Jima is claimed to be one of a number of Japanese islands which has been used by the United States to host nuclear arms, according to Robert S. Norris, William M. Arkin, and William Burr writing for the Bulletin of the Atomic Scientists in early 2000.
This is despite a Japanese policy of not allowing nuclear weapons on Japanese soil. Whether the site is used for this purpose is unknown, as great secrecy surrounds the United States' siting of nuclear arms bases; but on December 12, 1999, U.S. Under Secretary for Defense Policy Walter Slocombe told The New York Times, "Our position is that there have been no violations of our obligations under the security treaty and related arrangements."

Norris, Arkin and Burr concluded however:

There were nuclear weapons on Chichi Jima and Iwo Jima (Iwo To), an enormous and varied nuclear arsenal on Okinawa, nuclear bombs (without their fission cores) stored on the mainland at Misawa and Itazuke airbases (and possibly at Atsugi, Iwakuni, Johnson, and Komaki airbases as well), and nuclear-armed U.S. Navy ships stationed in Sasebo and Yokosuka. ... Chichi Jima, Iwo Jima, and Okinawa were under U.S. occupation, that the bombs stored on the mainland lacked their plutonium and/ or uranium cores, and that the nuclear-armed ships were a legal inch away from Japanese soil. All in all, this elaborate stratagem maintained the technicality that the United States had no nuclear weapons "in Japan."

See also

 List of volcanoes in Japan
 List of islands
 Desert island
 Naval Base Iwo Jima

References

External links

Ioto - Japan Meteorological Agency 
Ioto: National catalogue of the active volcanoes in Japan - Japan Meteorological Agency
Io To - Geological Survey of Japan
Iwo-jima volcano - volcanodiscovery
Volcano Cafe report

Battle of Iwo Jima
Volcano Islands
Former populated places in Japan
Subduction volcanoes
Submarine calderas
Uninhabited islands of Japan
Calderas of Japan
World War II sites in Japan
World War II sites of the United States
Islands of Tokyo
Volcanoes of Tokyo
Important Bird Areas of the Nanpo Islands